Nordagutu Station is a railway station in Midt-Telemark in Vestfold og Telemark, Norway located on the Sørlandet Line and the Bratsberg Line. The station is served by express trains to Kristiansand and local trains to Notodden and Grenland. The station's main purpose is to allow transfers between the two railway lines, thus giving passengers from Notodden and Grenland access to Sørlandet Line, and vice versa.

History
The station was opened in 1917 as part of the Bratsberg Line, and in 1924 became part of the Sørlandet Line when it was expanded to Bø.

Gallery

External links
 Bane NOR entry 
 Norsk Jernbaneklubb entry

Railway stations on the Sørlandet Line
Railway stations on the Bratsberg Line
Railway stations in Vestfold og Telemark
Railway stations opened in 1917
1917 establishments in Norway